The North Battleford station is a former railway station in North Battleford, Saskatchewan. It was built by the Canadian National Railway in 1956 and used as a passenger terminal. North Battleford no longer receives scheduled passenger rail service (the closest stations are now served by Via Rail station to the south in Biggar and Unity), and the station is now used as office space for CNR, and was once the intercity bus terminal. 

The building is designed in the International Style with a main entrance located in the tower; passenger facilities, waiting room and washrooms at one end on the ground floor with baggage and parcel service at the other end; office space on upper floors; much of the original interior finishes, (terrazzo, plaster and linoleum) still service.
The building was designated a historic railway station in 1995.

See also
 List of designated heritage railway stations of Canada

References 

Canadian National Railway stations in Saskatchewan
Designated Heritage Railway Stations in Saskatchewan
North Battleford
Railway stations in Canada opened in 1956
Disused railway stations in Canada